Events from the year 1506 in art.

Events
 14 January - The classical statue of Laocoön and His Sons is unearthed in a vineyard near the site of the Domus Aurea of the Roman emperor Nero and the Basilica di Santa Maria Maggiore in Rome. On the recommendation of Giuliano da Sangallo and Michelangelo, Pope Julius II purchases it and places it on public display in the Vatican a month later.
 Francesco Raibolini becomes a court painter in Mantua.

Works

Painting

 Giorgione
 Laura (Portrait of a Young Bride)
 Young Man with Arrow (approximate date)
 Leonardo da Vinci – Mona Lisa
 Raphael
 Madonna del cardellino
 Portrait of Maddalena Doni
 Young Woman with Unicorn
 Albrecht Dürer – Portrait of a Young Woman

Births
April 13 - Peter Faber (or Pierre Favre), French Jesuit painter and sculptor (died 1546)
date unknown - Ippolito Costa, Italian painter (died 1561)
probable
Domenico del Barbieri, Florentine painter (died 1570)
Hans Brosamer, German engraver, wood-cutter, and portraitist (died 1554)
Girolamo Lombardo, Italian sculptor (died 1590)
Bernard Salomon, French painter, draftsman and engraver (died 1561)

Deaths
August 26 - Sesshū Tōyō, master of suibokuga (ink painting), and a Rinzai Zen Buddhist priest (born 1420)
September 13 - Andrea Mantegna, Italian Renaissance painter (born 1431)
probable
Pietro di Domenico - Italian Renaissance painter (born 1457)
Pier Antonio Mezzastris, Italian painter of the Umbrian school (born 1430)
Giovanni di Stefano, Italian bronze-caster, engineer, and sculptor (born 1443)

 
Years of the 16th century in art
1500s in art